Aubrey Willard (1894–1961) was an Australian tennis player. He was the brother of Australian singles finalist James Willard.  Aubrey Willard served as a driver in the DAC in World war 1. He made his debut at the Australasian championships in 1922 and lost in round three to Andrew Huthnance. At the Australasian championships in 1925, Willard lost in the quarter finals to Gerald Patterson. In 1928 he lost in round two to Edgar Moon. In 1931 he lost in the Australian quarter finals to Harry Hopman. In 1932, Willard beat Jack Cummings. Willard's play at the net won him the match. Willard lost to Hopman in the quarter finals. In 1934 Willard lost in round three to Adrian Quist and then turned professional, becoming a coach.

Grand Slam finals

Mixed Doubles (1 runner-up)

References

1894 births
1961 deaths
Australian male tennis players
Tennis people from New South Wales
People from Bathurst, New South Wales
Sportsmen from New South Wales